The 1933–34 National Football League was the 7th staging of the National Football League, a Gaelic football tournament for the Gaelic Athletic Association county teams of Ireland, held in 1933 and 1934.

Mayo won the league after a replayed final.

Format 
There were four divisions – Northern, Southern, Eastern and Western. Division winners played off for the NFL title.

Results and Tables

Group I

Results

Group II

Results

Table

Division III

Results

Table

Division IV

Results

Final

References

National Football League
National Football League
National Football League (Ireland) seasons